Dangerous Summer is a 2000 Latvian film directed by Aigars Grauba starring Inese Cauna, Uldis Dumpis, Eduards Pāvuls, Jānis Reinis, and Artūrs Skrastiņš.

Plot
Set in Riga, the capital of Latvia, the film tells a tragic love story before and during the Soviet occupation of Latvia in 1940 and the early stages of World War II. Roberts (Artūrs Skrastiņš), a radio journalist, falls in love with Baltic German student Isolde (Inese Cauna), who's about to be deported to Germany. Isolde is torn between her love for Roberts and her chance at escaping for Germany with the help of Latvian foreign minister Vilhelms Munters (Uldis Dumpis).

References

External links 
 

2000 films
Latvian drama films
Films directed by Aigars Grauba